Incakujira is an extinct genus of rorqual from the Late Miocene (Huayquerian in the SALMA classification) Pisco Formation in western Peru.

Description 

Incakujira differs from other rorquals (fossil and extant) in having a less attenuated rostrum and the features of the maxilla, supraorbital, and remainder of the cranium. Kujira in the genus name means "whale" in Japanese.

Biology 
The twisted postglenoid process of the squamosal suggests that the lunge-feeding capabilities of Incakujira were not as great as those of extant rorquals, and that Incakujira itself also pursued additional krill-feeding strategies like skimming.

References

Bibliography 
 

Miocene cetaceans
Prehistoric cetacean genera
Tortonian life
Miocene mammals of South America
Huayquerian
Neogene Peru
Fossils of Peru
Pisco Formation
Fossil taxa described in 2016
Extinct animals of Peru